Chiana may refer to:

 Chiana Valley, or Valdichiana, in Tuscany and Umbria, Italy
 Chiana (river), or Chiani, the river of the Valdichiana, Italy
 Chiana, Iran, or Chianeh, a village in West Azerbaijan Province, Iran
 Chiana, a community in Kassena-Nankana West District, Upper East Region, Ghana
 Chiana Senior High School, in Chiana, Ghana
 Chiana (Farscape), a fictional character in the TV series Farscape